Kentucky Route 144 (KY 144) is a  state highway running northeast from KY 603 in Owensboro, Kentucky to US 31W in Radcliff near Fort Knox

Route description

Major intersections

See also

 List of state highways in Kentucky

References

External links

0144
0144
0144
0144
0144
0144